The 8th Army (German: 8. Armee Oberkommando) was a World War II field army. It existed twice during the war, in the invasion of Poland in 1939, and on the Eastern Front from 1943 onwards. 

The 8th Army was activated on 1 August 1939 with General Johannes Blaskowitz in command. In 1939 it was part of Gerd von Rundstedt's Army Group South for the Invasion of Poland. It consisted of two corps, X. Armeekorps and XIII. Armeekorps, and was responsible for the northern part of Army Group South's front. The army saw heavy combat during the Battle of the Bzura. After the conclusion of the Polish campaign, it was reorganized into the 2nd Army which took part in the Battle of France in 1940. 

In 1943 it was reformed after the Battle of Kursk from Army Detachment Kempf. After fierce defensive battles throughout 1943, 1944 and the first months of 1945, it finally surrendered in Austria in 1945. It fought in Hungary, Romania, and Austria in 1944 and 1945.

Commanders

References
Sources

Citations

08
Military units and formations established in 1939
Military units and formations disestablished in 1939
Military units and formations established in 1943
Military units and formations disestablished in 1945